Raffaele Rubattino (10 October 1810, Genoa – 2 November 1881) was an Italian entrepreneur and colonialist who started a shipping company that ran merchant ships on the routes to the Mediterranean and the Red Sea. He was also a founder of the Italian navy

Biography  
Raffaele Rubattino was born in Genoa on 10 October 1810 in a family of business people. He started a transport business in 1833 between Genoa and Milan and then merged it with the business of Gavino and Lazzaro Rebizzo.  In 1843 he began a steamboat service in the Mediterranean with two small vessels, Castore and Polluce. The latter collided with the Mongebella. He then built larger ships: Cagliari, Piemonte, and Lombardo. The latter two carried Garibaldi and his men to Marsala in 1860.

His company formed an agreement in 1881 with the Sicilian shipping company of Vincenzo Florio to form the Navigazione Generale Italiana. 

Rubattino was politically active and used his business to advance many causes. He was a patriot and supported Nino Bixio in the unification of Italy. In 1869, Rubattino saw the value of the Suez canal and bought the Bay of Assab from a local ruler through Giuseppe Sapeto. Initially only meant to be a coal depot, this aided Italian colonialism in Eritrea and the establishment of Italian Eritrea by the sale of the land to the Italian state in 1882.

On November 2, 1881, Rubattino died from a malarial fever. He is buried at Staglieno and a statue by Augusto Rivalta stands at Piazza Caricamento in Genoa.

References

External links 
 Biography (in Italian)

1810 births
1881 deaths
Italian businesspeople